Blagodatnoye , rural localities in Russia, may refer to:

 Blagodatnoye, Korenevsky District, Kursk Oblast, a selo
 Blagodatnoye, Kurchatovsky District, Kursk Oblast, a village
 Blagodatnoye, Medvensky District, Kursk Oblast, a village
 Blagodatnoye, Lipetsk Oblast, a village
 Blagodatnoye, Novosibirsk Oblast, a selo
 Blagodatnoye, Oryol Oblast, a village
 Blagodatnoye, Primorsky Krai, a selo
 Blagodatnoye, Saratov Oblast, a selo
 Blagodatnoye, Smolensk Oblast, a village
 Blagodatnoye, Stavropol Krai, a selo
 Blagodatnoye, Tyumen Oblast, a village
 Blagodatnoye, Udmurtia, a village
 Blagodatnoye, Khabarovsk Krai, a selo

Also
 Blagodatnoye, an abandoned Soviet airbase in Khabarovsk Krai, Russia

See also
 Blagodatnoye mine, one of the largest gold mines in the world in Khabarovsk Krai

ru:Благодатное
pl:Błagodatnoje
nl:Blagodatnoje
de:Błagodatnoje